Fjordia insolita is a species of sea slug, an aolid nudibranch, a marine gastropod mollusk in the family Flabellinidae.

Distribution
This species occurs in the Strait of Gibraltar

References

 Gofas, S.; Le Renard, J.; Bouchet, P. (2001). Mollusca. in: Costello, M.J. et al. (eds), European Register of Marine Species: a check-list of the marine species in Europe and a bibliography of guides to their identification. Patrimoines Naturels. 50: 180-213

External links
  Korshunova, T.; Martynov, A.; Bakken, T.; Evertsen, J.; Fletcher, K.; Mudianta, W.; Saito, H.; Lundin, K.; Schrödl, M.; Picton, B. (2017). Polyphyly of the traditional family Flabellinidae affects a major group of Nudibranchia: aeolidacean taxonomic reassessment with descriptions of several new families, genera, and species (Mollusca, Gastropoda). ZooKeys. 717: 1-139

Flabellinidae